Mpho Mbiyozo (born 7 February 1983) is a former South African rugby union player who played with  and the  between 2005 and 2013. He usually played as a flanker.

Career

Youth
He was born in Lusikisiki, went to school at Grey High School in Port Elizabeth and represented  in various youth competitions until being included in the 2005 Vodacom Cup squad.

Senior career
He represented the national sevens team until 2009, when he announced he wanted to return to the fifteen-a-side game.

Mpho also made history during the 2009 British & Irish Lions tour to South Africa, when he became the first player to score a try for the newly created Southern Kings rugby franchise.

2013 Southern Kings Super Rugby season
He was included in the  squad for the 2013 Super Rugby season, but failed to make any of their initial matchday squads. Instead, he was the regular captain of the  team in their 2013 Vodacom Cup campaign, leading them to their best performance up to that point in the Vodacom Cup by reaching the semi-finals. He played in seven of their nine games that season and scored three tries, making him the joint top try scorer for the EP Kings in that competition.

Vigo
Mbiyozo also had a season playing for Spanish side Vigo in the 2014–15 División de Honor de Rugby. He made 20 appearances and scored 10 tries, to finish in the top ten of the try-scoring charts of the competition. However, despite his efforts, his side finished bottom of the log to be relegated to the División de Honor B de Rugby.

References

South African rugby union players
Eastern Province Elephants players
Boland Cavaliers players
Southern Kings players
Western Province (rugby union) players
Living people
1983 births
South Africa international rugby sevens players
Rugby union flankers